Ayaka Suzuki (born 28 February 1997) is a Japanese professional footballer who plays as a defender for WE League club Nojima Stella.

Club career 
Suzuki made her WE League debut on 20 September 2021.

References 

WE League players
Living people
1997 births
Japanese women's footballers
Women's association football defenders
Association football people from Tochigi Prefecture
Nojima Stella Kanagawa Sagamihara players